The Cantonal Council of Zürich is the legislature of the canton of Zürich, in Switzerland. Zürich has a unicameral legislature.  The Cantonal Council has 180 seats, with members elected every four years.

Elections
The council is re-elected every four years.  Like other legislatures in Switzerland, elections use proportional representation with biproportional apportionment.  There are eighteen constituencies, which are based on the canton's twelve districts.  The district of Winterthur is split into two constituencies, one representing the city of Winterthur, and the other representing the surrounding countryside.  The city of Zürich is split into six constituencies, each composed of two metropolitan districts.

Latest elections

President 
The council is presided over by the president, who is re-elected every year.

List of presidents

Notes and references

See also 
 Executive Council of Zürich
 List of cantonal legislatures of Switzerland

External links
  Cantonal Council of Zürich official website

Zurich
Politics of the canton of Zürich
Zurich